Milford on Sea LNR is a   local nature reserve in Milford on Sea in Hampshire. It is owned and managed by Milford On Sea Parish Council.

The Danes Stream runs through this nature reserve, which has ancient woodland, grassland and winding paths.

References

Local Nature Reserves in Hampshire